The Manly Warringah Sea Eagles are an Australian professional rugby league club based in Sydney's Northern Beaches. The team colours are maroon and white, while their namesake and logo is the sea eagle. They compete in Australia's premier rugby league competition, the National Rugby League (NRL). The club debuted in the 1947 New South Wales Rugby Football League season and currently host the majority of their home games from Brookvale Oval in Brookvale, while training at the New South Wales Academy of Sport in Narrabeen.

The club has competed in either the NSWRL, ARL, or NRL competitions in all respective seasons from 1947 until 1999. At the end of 1999 they entered into a joint venture with the North Sydney Bears to form the Northern Eagles, which Rugby League statisticians regard as a separate club. The Northern Eagles competed in the 2000 and 2001 NRL seasons, after which the joint venture collapsed. The Manly Warringah club (who held the NRL licence) competed in the NRL as the Northern Eagles for a further season in 2002, before abandoning the name and identity to return to what they are known as today.

Since winning their first premiership in 1972, the club has won a further seven first grade titles, with their most recent being in 2011. The club's eight titles span five consecutive decades. Since their first Grand Final appearance in 1951, the club has appeared in 19 Grand Finals across seven consecutive decades.

Cliff Lyons holds the club record for most first grade games (309). Steve Menzies played 349 first grade games, however 69 were with the Northern Eagles. The club record for most career points is held by Graham Eadie (1,917), Matthew Ridge held the highest season total with 257 (1995) which has since been overtaken by Reuben Garrick with a season total of 304 (2021). Brett Stewart is the top try scorer with 163, which eclipsed the record previously held by Steven Menzies. Menzies' scored 151 tries playing for Manly Warringah, and a further 29 during the Northern Eagles venture. Menzies is regarded as being the highest try scoring forward in the history of the game, however there is some contention as to the exact number of tries scored, as he started some games playing in the centres. There is contention too over  Manly's career try scoring record with respect to Menzies and the Northern Eagles venture.

History
By the mid 1940s, the movement to expand rugby league in Sydney had gained serious momentum and Manly, as with all the other Sydney district rugby clubs, endured internal agonies as the new "League" was considered. In 1946, Manly Warringah defeated North Sydney 12-8 in the Presidents Cup Grand Final which helped the club gain momentum in pushing for inclusion into the NSWRL competition. 

The NSWRL finally accepted Manly's application on the 4 November 1946 after two unsuccessful bids in 1937 and 1944. Along with Parramatta, they were granted admission to the 1947 competition. It was North Sydney themselves who had the most to lose from Manly entering the league but they advocated for a team to be on the Northern Beaches. Norths believed Manly's inclusion in the competition would provide a far better platform for Rugby League to gain a hold over Rugby Union in the peninsula area.

North Sydney endured an exodus of players to the newly formed team with 20 Manly juniors returning to play for their local club in their first season. Norths lost half of their games in 1947, before spending the next four seasons towards the bottom of the ladder.

Manly immediately adopted the maroon and white colours they had used for their Presidents Cup team since its inception and borrowed originally from the Freshwater SLSC of which Ken Arthurson and other players were members. For their emblem they chose the sea eagle – the native bird of prey of the Sydney coastline. Although a number of media writers referred to Manly as the "sea gulls", the club maintains that it has always officially been the Sea Eagles.

Manly's first premiership game was against Western Suburbs at Brookvale Oval on Saturday 12 April 1947. Max Whitehead, who had first played for Norths in 1942 and was a member of their 1943 Grand Final team, was Manly's first captain. Whitehead was a big barrel-chested second rower who was used by Bonds as the model for their iconic "Chesty Bond" character. Their first win was against the Parramatta Eels and the club finished their first season in second last place.

Manly's first Grand Final appearance was in the 1951 season, which they lost to South Sydney. Manly Warringah played in five Grand Finals before winning their first premiership in 1972. They then won the following year in 1973 and again in 1976 and 1978. The 1973 final against Cronulla is reputed to be one of the hardest and toughest grand finals, at least in the televised era. There were several incidents of players being hurt, in particular very tough and hard English import, Mal Reilly, was "taken" out early and did not take any further part in the game.

Manly were powerful in the early 1980s but were beaten in two consecutive Grand finals by Parramatta, in 1982 and 1983. Their next premiership was won against the Canberra Raiders in the 1987 Grand final, the last Grand Final played at the Sydney Cricket Ground. Coached by Bob Fulton, the Sea Eagles returned to the play-offs in 1993 and 1994 but were beaten on each occasions in the first elimination semi-final by the Brisbane Broncos.

In 1988, Manly, missing six regular first grade players, including captain Paul Vautin, Michael O'Connor and Phil Daley who were all playing in the first Ashes series test just four days later, plus other stars such as Dale Shearer, Mal Cochrane and David Ronson (all six had played in the 1987 Grand Final win), put the touring Great Britain Lions to the sword with a 30-0 demolition at Brookvale Oval. Teenage halfback Geoff Toovey was named man of the match, scoring one of the Sea Eagles five tries on the night while the side was led by Noel Cleal who had a point to prove after being a shock omission from the Australian team. Great Britain's coach for their 1988 tour was Mal Reilly who had played lock forward for the Manly in their 1972 and 1973 Grand Final wins. It would be the first time that former premiership teammates Fulton and Reilly would oppose each other from the coaches box. With Fulton taking over as coach of the Australian team from 1989, it would not be their last time coaching against each other.

In 1995, amidst the Super League war, Manly produced one of its most dominating seasons in the club's history but in one of the league's biggest upsets, were beaten by Canterbury in the Grand Final. Despite being the best attacking side all year, the Sea Eagles could not score a try in the Grand Final and were outclassed by the underdog Canterbury side. There was some controversy in the game but with all games you create your own luck and the Bulldogs were deserved winners who were led by the champion Terry Lamb.

In 1996 Manly made another Grand Final appearance and beat St. George to win the title that had eluded them the season before. Rugby League in Australia was split in two leagues in 1997, the ARL and Super League, and Manly were one of the leading teams in the ARL competition. For the third consecutive year Manly reached the Grand Final, however lapses in their intensity which appeared during the season returned in the premiership decider against the Mal Reilly coached Newcastle Knights and the Sea Eagles were beaten on the full-time siren by a Knights try.

The Manly teams of 1995 to 1997 produced some of the most entertaining football in Sea Eagles' history, but also featured rugby league's strongest defence. Many great players featured, including Des Hasler, Geoff Toovey, Nik Kosef, Steve Menzies, Terry Hill, Mark Carroll, Cliff Lyons, David Gillespie, Craig Hancock, Danny Moore, John Hopoate, and former NZ All Blacks Matthew Ridge and Craig Innes.

After 1997 the club lost form on the field, recording only 10th place in the 1998 season, and missing the finals in 1999.

Northern Eagles

Manly Warringah would usher in the new millennium by merging with the North Sydney Bears to become the Northern Eagles. This venture would run between 2000 and 2002. The club was formed during the rationalisation process of the NRL. The team would share home games between Brookvale Oval and Central Coast Stadium, Gosford, New South Wales.

Little success was had during these three seasons, finishing 12th, 10th, and 9th, winning 30 of 76 games. Also, the new club's decision to play games in Gosford instead of the Bears home ground at North Sydney Oval alienated several North Sydney fans, despite North Sydney's planned move to the new Central Coast Stadium. In spite of this, the club provided more players for the 2001 State of Origin series' New South Wales team than any other club. The partnership foundered in 2002, with Manly emerging as the stand-alone entity. The 2002 season was played under the Northern Eagles name, although effectively the club was the Manly-Warringah Sea Eagles by another name. Halfway through the season, the Eagles even abandoned playing games at Gosford, due to a sharp decline in attendances. The people of Gosford preferred to wait until a home grown team was based there. The joint venture would collapse by the end of the 2001 season and Manly would officially make a welcome return to the NRL in 2003.

Resurrection
The joint venture collapsed and Manly retained the Northern Eagles licence for the 2002 season until returning to the competition as Manly Warringah Sea Eagles for the 2003 season. The 2003 and 2004 seasons produced very few moments of joy for Sea Eagles supporters. The club improved its playing stocks for 2005, and reached the semi-finals for the first time since 1998. Manly would not miss the finals until 2015, whilst every other club have missed the finals at least once since 2004.
A meeting of the Football Club on 3 June 2004 saw the club members vote for the privatisation of the Football Club.

During this period, Manly introduced a number of players who became stars of the game over the next decade including local juniors Jason King and Anthony Watmough, as well as the Stewart brothers from Wollongong, back row forward Glenn and speedy try scoring fullback Brett.

2007 season

Manly would finish the regular season in 2nd (out of 16) place. Manly only lost six matches in the 2007 season. Their 50-16 mauling of Newcastle ensured they would finish in the top two. Throughout the season they were the only club chasing Melbourne (whom they beat in round 11) for the minor premiership. After defeating North Queensland at the Sydney Football Stadium 28–6, Manly played in their 15th grand final against Melbourne. Manly were beaten 34–8 by Melbourne on 30 September at Telstra Stadium.

Melbourne would later be stripped of the 2007 title for salary cap breaches.

2008 season

With the departure of hooker Michael Monaghan, many questioned whether the Manly could be as competitive as in 2007 and losses in the first 2 rounds seemed to confirm this. Manly finished the regular season tied first with Melbourne and Cronulla but 2nd on points differential and Manly missed out on claiming their first minor premiership since 1997.

In the qualifying final Manly faced 7th placed St. George at Brookvale. This game was club legend Steve Menzies' last game at Brookvale and he opened the scoring with an unusual charge down try in which after kicking ahead to himself and falling over, the ball bounced up and hit him in the head before he finally grounded it. After getting the week off, Manly faced the history-making New Zealand Warriors. Manly crushed the Warriors 32–6 and showcased their trademark wall of defence and attacking flair. With the win, Manly qualified for their 17th grand final, where in a rematch of the 2007 decider, they would play the Melbourne Storm.

The story of the grand final was very different for Manly-Warringah this time around, as they decimated Melbourne 40–0 (which was the biggest amount of points scored against a team in a grand final) to win their seventh premiership in front of 80,388 at ANZ Stadium. It was Michael Monaghan's replacement, the previously unknown Matt Ballin who scored the first try of the match. The game was also notable for winger Michael Robertson's hat-trick (the first time a Manly player had scored 3 tries in a finals game since Gordon Willoughby scored 3 against Western Suburbs in the 1951 Semi-final at the SCG) and retiring legend Steve Menzies' try 10 minutes from full-time, which he scored after coming back onto the field to replace the injured Steve Matai. Manly prop forward Brent Kite was awarded the Clive Churchill Medal after a powerhouse display which included a classy try in the 58th minute. This is the largest winning margin in a grand final in rugby league history.

2009 season

Three weeks prior to the 2009 season, Des Hasler and his team travelled to England where as the reigning NRL premiers they would take on reigning Super League premiers the Leeds Rhinos in the 2009 World Club Challenge to be played at the Elland Road ground in Leeds. After having lost their previous World Club Challenge game to Wigan in 1987 (with Hasler the halfback in that Manly side), the Sea Eagles took this game much more seriously and included a warm-up game against the Harlequins in London a week before the game (won 34-26 by the Sea Eagles). The warm-up game (Manly were the first Australian side to actually play such a game before a WCC) proved effective as Manly went on to win the WCC 28–20 over the Rhinos.

The 2009 season boded poorly as a result of two incidents on the day of Manly-Warringah's season launch. Second-rower Anthony Watmough was assaulted by a sponsor after allegedly making inappropriate comments to his daughter. Brett Stewart later that night was charged with the sexual assault of a 17-year-old girl outside his apartment block, of which he was subsequently cleared, an incident which led to the damning Four Corners investigation, "Code of Silence". Stewart was cleared of the charge in late September 2010 by a jury which took 45 minutes to reach their decision.

Manly-Warringah paid a $100,000 fine for failing to adequately punish Stewart for his offence. Stewart faced a brief trial at the time, and a further, more comprehensive trial began in March 2010. As a result of Stewart's absence, Manly lost their first four games of the season, crashing to last place after round four (thus becoming the first defending premier since Melbourne in 2000 to lose their first four matches of a season), before finally achieving a 23–10 win against the Tigers in which Stewart scored three tries in his first match for 2009.

A double against Souths followed, before injury struck. Stewart only played five games overall in 2009 following a serious knee injury suffered in round six, before returning in round 25. The Sea Eagles snared fifth place at the end of the season and lost the first qualifying final to eventual grand final winners Melbourne 40–12 in a one-sided contest played at Melbourne's Etihad Stadium. Due to other unfavourable results occurring on the weekend, Manly were eliminated from the premiership race. This premiership was also stripped from the Storm.

2010 season

In 2010, Manly-Warringah started the season with a team of many new faces, including young playmaker Kieran Foran. After narrowly losing their first two games of the season, Manly won their third, following three matches against Newcastle, the Warriors and the Sharks before a late season slump saw them settle for eighth position on the ladder.

Manly-Warringah players were not involved in any further violations in 2010, and embarked on an active program of community engagement, which included activities such as reading at schools and raising money for charities.

Manly's season got off to the worst possible start. While warming up for the opening round game against the Wests Tigers at the Sydney Football Stadium, international winger David Williams injured his shoulder forcing him to withdraw from the game. Unfortunately the injury would require surgery which saw Williams ruled out for the remainder of the season. The situation then got worse when fullback Brett Stewart suffered a knee injury when he ruptured his Anterior cruciate ligament during the first half of the game. Stewart's injury would also rule him out for the remainder of the season. This would cause Des Hasler to re-shuffle his backline over the course of the season after losing two of his teams most lethal attacking weapons.

Manly-Warringah spent much of the middle of the season near the top of the ladder and were earmarked as a possible premiership contender with impressive wins over the St. George Illawarra Dragons and the Wests Tigers. Inconsistent form, injuries and suspensions caused a dramatic slide down the ladder and Manly were lucky to settle on 8th and just make the finals. Had it not been for the Melbourne Storm salary cap breach earlier in the season, Manly-Warringah would have missed the finals altogether for the first time since 2004. In round 25, ballplaying second-rower Glenn Stewart was suspended for 4 matches for a high shot on Sydney Roosters captain Braith Anasta, and in round 26 centre Steve Matai was suspended for 7 matches for a high tackle that knocked out Canterbury-Bankstown Bulldogs hooker Michael Ennis. Their 2010 season ended with a dismal 28–0 hammering from the eventual premiers St. George Illawarra, although Manly-Warringah were still in the game with 15 minutes remaining. Manly went into this game with 11 of their first choice players out with either injury or suspension and many of those who did play were still carrying injuries.

2011 season

At the end of the 2010 season Manly Warringah lost Trent Hodkinson who signed a deal with the Bulldogs from the start of the 2011 season, as well as Josh Perry and Ben Farrar to the Super League. Daly Cherry-Evans, who came from Manly's Queensland Cup feeder club the Sunshine Coast Sea Eagles, was brought into first grade. Manly-Warringah had not made any big-name signings for the 2011 season. This showed up in its lowly 8th placing, its poorest performance in a season since 2005.

Manly-Warringah's 2011 season started with an 18–6 loss to the Melbourne Storm in Melbourne. Brett Stewart had minimal impact on the match but escaped injury-free. This was followed with an upset 27–16 win over beaten 2010 Grand Finalists the Sydney Roosters, where Manly-Warringah went into the match without its captain Jamie Lyon, Shane Rodney, Dean Whare and Glenn Stewart through injury and also Jason King and Steve Matai through suspension. Brett Stewart was appointed acting captain for the Roosters match. This is regarded as one of the most commendable wins in Manly's history and featured outstanding performances by its younger players including Kieran Foran, Jamie Buhrer, William Hopoate and Vic Mauro. This was followed up with a 26–12 win over the Newcastle Knights at Brookvale, before a 32–20 loss to the South Sydney Rabbitohs which ended Manly's unbeaten run at Bluetongue Stadium, having won all of its previous matches at the venue.

Anthony Watmough and Terence Seu Seu were both stood down by the club for off-field offences prior to its round five match against Cronulla at Toyota Stadium. The Sea Eagles were in trouble midway through the second half, down 13–0, before scoring 19 unanswered points, including a try after the siren by Michael Oldfield, to give the Silvertails a 19–13 victory.

Despite losing many players from the 2010 season, the Sea Eagles found themselves sitting in second place on the NRL Ladder at the end of the regular season, behind the Melbourne Storm. They lost only five matches in the season, all being night matches. Manly-Warringah won all of its matches at Brookvale Oval, again nicknamed "Brookie Fortress". The final game at Brookvale was a Top of the Table Clash against the Melbourne Storm. Manly won this game 18–4 but the win was overshadowed by a brawl between Glenn Stewart and Adam Blair, giving the game the nickname 'The Battle of Brookvale'.

In their opening playoff game, Manly-Warringah registered a 42–8 win over the North Queensland Cowboys at the Sydney Football Stadium. After a disappointing first half, Manly scored 42 unanswered points in the 2nd half, and progressed to the preliminary final. In this match, they defeated the Brisbane Broncos 26–14 to be the first team through to the 2011 NRL Grand Final, where they met the New Zealand Warriors who were vying for their first ever premiership.

A season of success culminated in Manly-Warringah winning its eighth premiership, defeating the New Zealand Warriors 24–10 in the Grand Final. Glenn Stewart was awarded the Clive Churchill Medal for his 34 tackles and a crucial try in the second half. He and brother Brett Stewart became the first brothers to score tries in the same Grand Final. Manly-Warringah's second premiership in four years make them the only team thus far to win more than one premiership in the 21st century.

Six Weeks after Manly Warringah's premiership win, the club dismissed head coach Des Hasler after he was revealed to have breached his contract by trying to lure coaching staff and players to the Bulldogs where he was to have started coaching in 2013. This meant that Geoff Toovey, who was to take over as part of a succession plan, was immediately elevated to the role of head coach from the start of the 2012 season.

2012 season

Manly Warringah's pre-season started dismally with a 38–6 loss to perennial strugglers Cronulla in the first match played under new coach Geoff Toovey. This was followed by a 26–12 loss in the 2012 World Club Challenge to Leeds Rhinos.

The Sea Eagles' premiership defence began with an away trip to Eden Park in Auckland where they faced the New Zealand Warriors in the Grand Final rematch and won 26–20. They backed up that close win with another close win against the Wests Tigers, winning 22–18. Manly-Warringah lost its first match for the 2012 season when it went down 17–13 to the Cronulla-Sutherland Sharks in a major upset, then another loss followed when it fell to 2010 premiers St. George Illawarra at Kogarah by 17–4.

Manly-Warringah ended the 2012 Regular season in 4th position on the ladder. After being defeated by the Bulldogs in the first week of the finals, Manly defeated the Nth Queensland Cowboys, effectively ending their season. However, the Sea Eagles' season ended the next week after being defeated by eventual premiers Melbourne Storm.

2013 season

Manly-Warringah could look at 2013 as a whole and be proud of just how much they achieved.

Ambushed early in the year by the sudden rise of two new title contenders in South Sydney and the Sydney Roosters, Manly spent much of the season flying under the radar with a top four spot safely in their keeping, but minor premiership never truly within their reach.

In fact, as the season wore on a mounting injury toll had many predicting this squad of ageing warriors were bound to hit the wall. Certainly a series of gruelling encounters at the business end of the season provided plenty of excuses had they wanted to use them, but instead it seemed the greater the challenge the more the Sea Eagles lifted to tackle it.

Having not beaten a fellow top four side all season, they finally did so in style with a 28-8 thrashing of Melbourne in Round 25 to warm up for the finals. For a side that so many tipped to begin a downward slide in 2013, Manly proved to all and sundry just what a champion side they are. Despite facing a number of hurdles through the course of the season – from a lengthy list of injury woes to the ASADA investigation which threatened to become a significant distraction at times – they managed to grow in stature as the season progressed and when the big games were there to be won at the back end of the year their experience shone through.

Like any quality side, their failure to top it all off with a win in the grand final will rankle over the off-season but premierships were never meant to come easily. Any would still be able to look back with plenty of pride and satisfaction at another brilliant season in which they proved they are one of the NRL's real power clubs.

2014 season

Most of the headlines for Manly throughout the year came more due to off-field reasons following news popular back-rower Glenn Stewart would be joining Souths in 2015 with the club's salary cap constraints preventing them from making him an offer.

It is a measure of the Northern Beaches club's decade of excellence that to bow out in the second week of the finals will be deemed a comparative failure by both players and fans. This is what happened after a late-season stutter saw them relinquish their grip on the minor premiership, lose several key players at just the wrong time, and get bundled out of the 2014 Finals Series in straight sets despite their top-two finish.
Even though they achieved a top-two finish, bowing out second week of the finals resulted in an unsatisfactory result for the Sea Eagles for a side that was running first from rounds 18–25. They had their fair share of luck throughout the season but it deserted them at the wrong time and ended Manly's season and encapsulated their late downturn in fortunes.
There were huge questions over which senior players would stick around until the end of, or beyond, their current contracts. It was questioned if this could be very much a new-look Manly side in the next year or two but as long as the club can lock down its two star halves past their current 2015 deals the future should remain bright.

2015 season

Manly struggled to maintain the previous consistency they produced over the past decade. They had made the finals every year for a decade, anything short of a top eight finish would have been seen a failure.

With success comes high expectations and Manly certainly didn't hit their own lofty standards in 2015. The club endured one of its toughest seasons of the modern era with highly publicised contract sagas involving their biggest players, the sacking of their coach and club legend Geoff Toovey and a shocking run of injuries. The team had a late, but ultimately helpless last throw from a champion side to make the finals.

2015 will be forever remembered as the changing of the guard at the northern beaches club, when their era of dominance crashed dramatically back down to earth. It was a changing of the guard for Manly, a year where an era of dominance finally came to an end. They lost stalwarts Anthony Watmough (Eels) and Glenn Stewart (Rabbitohs) and struggled for a large chunk of the season. They then lost Kieran Foran (Eels) and coach Geoff Toovey. However, Manly had a strong back half of the 2015 season and ended up finishing 9th, only just missing the finals after being dead last going into Round 17 and in danger of earning the club's first ever wooden spoon.

In a move seen to help turn the club's fortunes around, Bob Fulton was brought back to the club as a 'consultant' where he had a hand in the recruiting of a number of players for season 2016 such as Test and Qld Origin forward Nate Myles and South Sydney premiership centre Dylan Walker, as well as New Zealand internationals Lewis Brown and Martin Taupau. Fulton was also instrumental in convincing 2011 premiership halfback Daly Cherry-Evans to remain at the club after initially signing with the Gold Coast Titans. Also joining the club in 2016 would be boom Queensland hooker Matt Parcell from the Ipswich Jets, as well as Souths 2014 premiership hooker Apisai Koroisau. With the new recruits, plus the emergence of younger local juniors in 2015 including tough tackling front row forward Jake Trbojevic and his younger brother, pacey fullback/winger Tom Trbojevic, the future looks promising.

2016 season

After Geoff Toovey was sacked following the 2015 season, Manly signed former Australian and NSW half Trent Barrett to coach in what would be his rookie year as an NRL head coach. The team would be without the services of Kiwi five-eighth Kieran Foran who had joined rivals Parramatta, as well as long serving dual-premiership hooker Matt Ballin who was released after suffering his second anterior cruciate ligament (ACL) knee injury in two years. Local junior Clint Gutherson, who although he signed a contract extension with the club in 2015, was released following the season and he too joined Parramatta. Surprisingly, also let go was New Zealand test fullback/centre Peta Hiku who eventually joined Penrith.

In the first 9 rounds of the 2016 NRL season leading into the representative round, Manly's injury woes continued with Brett Stewart (hamstring), Jorge Taufua (broken collar bone), Daly Cherry-Evans (ankle sprain) and Tom Trbojevic (ankle) going down with long-term injuries often forcing Trent Barrett into naming a makeshift lineup. However, despite this and the club's horrendous draw which saw it have five 5 day turnarounds in the opening 9 rounds, they showed glimpses of becoming a top side once again, eventually finishing the regular season in 13th position, recording eight wins.

On 27 April, long serving premiership captain Jamie Lyon announced that he would retire from playing at the end of the 2016 season. Lyon, the club's 2011 premiership captain and a member of the 2008 premiership team, is one of only 4 players (along with Graham Eadie, Bob Batty and Matthew Ridge) to have scored over 1,000 competition points for Manly.

2017 season

After a turbulent 2016 Manly Warringah Sea Eagles season the Sea Eagles finished 6th position and made it to the 2017 NRL Finals Series, although lost the first week to Penrith. At the end of season awards Daly Cherry-Evans won the Roy and Bull for best and fairest player.

2018 season

After the first two rounds, Manly were found guilty of minor breaches of the salary cap over the previous five years, due to a subtle change in one particular rule interpretation instigated by the NRL's CEO. A $750,000 fine (250k suspended) and a $330,000 reduction in the salary cap for 2018 and 2019 seasons was imposed by the NRL.

Manly had not paid any player over what they declared to the NRL but the definition of the phrase 'best efforts' to find third party payments was curiously changed to now mean an 'iron clad guarantee'by the NRL's CEO.  Investigation of close to one million pieces of information and searches of all relevant electrical devices showed all payments to players were correctly and accurately reported to the NRL.
The NRL's own salary auditors signed off as true and compliant all payments made to Manly players.

At the end of the 2018 season, Manly finished in 15th place on the table after a horror year on and off the field, one spot better than wooden spooners, Parramatta.
Throughout the season, there were rumours that surfaced highlighting major divisions and unrest with Barrett as coach. In October 2018, it was announced that two time premiership winning coach Des Hasler would return to  Manly, in the hope that he could take Manly back to the glory day's.

2019 season

Before the start of the 2019 NRL season, many predicted that Manly would finish outside the top 8 and struggle towards the bottom of the table.  Throughout the season though, Manly surprised many critics by spending nearly the entire regular season in the top 8 which included the club defeating Melbourne at AAMI Park 11–10 in golden point extra-time and also defeating other premiership contenders Canberra twice throughout the year.  Manly-Warringah eventually qualified for the finals with a 6th-place finish.

Manly would go on to reach the second week of the finals series but were defeated by South Sydney, 34–26 in the elimination final at ANZ Stadium.

2020 season

Manly-Warringah went into the 2020 NRL season as one of the favorites to win the premiership after a good year in 2019.  The club got off to a good start winning four of their first six games before a serious injury to star player Tom Trbojevic derailed their season with Manly winning only three of their last fourteen games to finish 13th and miss out on the finals.

2021 season

Manly didn’t start the 2021 NRL season well, losing their first four rounds. The match against Penrith, which they lost 46-6 at Brookvale Oval, was the club's biggest ever home defeat at the ground.

However their season turned around, and by round 16, Manly recorded their biggest ever victory in club history, defeating the Bulldogs 66-0 at Western Sydney Stadium. After the regular rounds, Manly would finish in the top 4 in 4th place.

The top try scorers for Manly at the end of the Regular Season were Tom Trbojevic with 25 tries, Jason Saab with 23 tries, and Reuben Garrick with 21 tries.

Reuben Garrick became the first player in rugby league to score more than 300 points in a Regular Season. He also became the first player in rugby league history to score 20 tries and 100 goals in a Premiership Season.

After losing in the opening week of the finals against Melbourne, the club won in week two of the finals defeating the Sydney Roosters 42-6.  In the preliminary final, the club fell short of reaching the grand final losing to South Sydney 36-16.

2022 season

Manly-Warringah went into the 2022 NRL season as one of the favorites to win the premiership after a good year in 2021. The club didn’t start the 2022 NRL season well, losing their first two rounds before winning their next four. Another serious injury to star player Tom Trbojevic in round 11 derailed their season once again with Manly winning only four of their last thirteen games to finish 11th and miss out on the finals. Their season was further marred by an incident when seven players boycotted the round 20 match against the Sydney Roosters due to their refusal to wear the club's "pride" jersey, which was the start of an unfortunate end to the year for the Sea Eagles.
On 13 October, the club decided to terminate Des Hasler as head coach.

Emblem and colours

The team has always been officially known as the "Manly-Warringah Sea Eagles" since 1947.

Upon entering the NSWRL, Manly took on the colours of maroon and white. Manly chose the sea eagle – the native bird of prey on the Sydney coastline – as its emblem. The club's first jersey was maroon with a large white 'V' on the front. Manly were one of the first teams to feature an emblem, with an 'MW' appearing in the early 1950s. The 'Sea Eagle' has appeared on all jerseys since the mid-1950s.

In 1956, Manly chose a new logo for their jersey, consisting of a maroon and white eagle sitting atop a rugby league ball with the letters 'MW' on it.

Manly would then change their logo a decade later in 1960, which depicted more accurately a sea eagle so as to not create confusion whether it was a sea eagle or a seagull.

From the 1980s, Manly would go on to use perhaps their most famous of logos used in what is regarded as their most successful years up until the creation of the new competition.

In conjunction with the new competition, the National Rugby League, Manly would change their logo in 1998. It featured predominantly maroon, white, yellow and blue to symbolise the connection the club had with its major sponsor at the time Pepsi. This logo would not last however when the ill-fated merger with North Sydney Bears in 2000 saw them take on the Northern Eagles moniker instead.

Upon their return in 2003, Manly opted to revert to the previous logo but tweaked it slightly to focus on the sea eagle and include Warringah in the club's name again. They also returned to their original colours however a darker shade of maroon and white, a symbol of their roots stemming back from 1947. This logo has been in use since then.

Jerseys

Manly Warringah Sea Eagles Leagues Club

Manly Warringah Rugby League Club is one of the leading clubs on Sydney's northern beaches and boasts in excess of 16,000 members.

Manly Leagues has always enjoyed a close association with the Manly Warringah Sea Eagles and is very proud of the team. The club's charter includes the support of rugby league in the local area and the outstanding history of the Sea Eagles highlights the success of this support.

Local catchment area
Historically, Manly has had a rich history of local juniors representing the first grade side, including former Australian, State and Club captains Max Krilich and Geoff Toovey. Other notable former local juniors include 4-time Premiership winners Ian Martin and Terry Randall and 2-time Premiership winners Steven Menzies and Anthony Watmough.

Notable former local juniors:

Local rugby league clubs play within the joint Manly-Warringah/North Sydney District Rugby League district competition.

Stadium
When Manly were accepted into the competition, the then Manly Council denied the club permission to use Manly Oval as a home ground. The council at the time was very pro-rugby union and attempted to stop the rival code spread to the area. Because of this, the club decided instead to acquire Brookvale Showground (now known as Brookvale Oval) to host matches, which was supported by then Warringah Council, who owned the ground.

The ground was mostly renovated between 1965 and 1980, including the construction of two grandstands along both the southern end (Southern Stand) and western side (Jane Try Stand) of the ground. In the early 1990s, these two grandstands were connected by the Ken Arthurson Stand. The ground has also retained grassy hill areas along the eastern and northern edges. On 1 September 2008, the Southern Stand was renamed the Fulton–Menzies Stand.

In recent years, Manly Warringah have received criticism over the state of facilities at Brookvale Oval. In 2007, Manly Warringah stepped up their campaign for government funding to improve the stadium, culminating in a "Save Brookvale Oval" Rally on 21 November. As of September 2008, $4,000,000 of Warringah Council funding and a $6,000,000 NSW State Government grant has been secured by the club to allow for the initial redevelopment of the Jane Try Stand (with an additional level) and improvements to the Southern Stand and other amenities. A further $10,000,000 was sought from, and granted by the Federal Government for the development of an eastern stand, with the intention of maintaining a 10-metre deep grassed area in front of it.

In recent seasons, Brookvale Oval has been regarded as a graveyard for many opposition teams, thus earning the nickname "Fortress Brookvale". Manly went through the 2011 season undefeated at its home ground, with no visiting team victorious at the ground since Round 26, 2010. In 2014, Manly held a 10–1 record at Brookvale Oval, narrowly losing to the Melbourne Storm in Round 1. In 2017 Manly didn't do well at Lottoland only winning 6 and losing 5.

Today the ground has an official capacity of 23,000, although the ground is generally full at just under 21,000. In 2006, the ground saw its largest average attendance over an entire season, with an average of 15,484 patrons watching each of the club's 11 matches played there. The record crowd at the ground is 27,655, set in the final round of the 1986 season against traditional rivals Parramatta. Since the club started playing in 1947, over five and a half million spectators have visited the ground.

Of the permanent venues used by the NRL in 2015, Brookvale Oval sits in second place for the most games played with 698 games behind only the 808 for Leichhardt Oval (as of December 2019).

As well as hosting home games at Brookvale, Manly play a home game against the Brisbane Broncos at Lang Park since 2016 as part of a double header in Indigenous Round and in 2016 and 2017, the Sea Eagles took a home game against the Warriors to Perth Oval. Between 2007 and 2015 the Sea Eagles hosted 13 home games at Central Coast Stadium.

In February 2017 a 3-year $1 million naming rights deal with Lottoland, renamed Brookvale Oval to "Lottoland". In August 2019 Lottoland group exercised its option to extend the sponsorship contract, worth $500,000 for another year to the end of the 2020 season. The final game to be played under the name "Lottoland" was in Round 9, 2021 of the NRL between the Sea Eagles and New Zealand Warriors.
A 4 year deal was signed with 4 Pines Brewing Company in June 2021 to be named "4 Pines Park"

Currently, a new $33.1m Centre of Excellence is under construction at the Western end of the oval, formerly home to the ‘Family Hill’. Once complete, the club will move all training and administration operations to this new, 4-storey building as well as the centre providing approximately 3,000 seats and premium hospitality spaces to be utilised on match day. The centre of excellence features change rooms, pools, a gym, training and medical spaces and general administration areas for staff to utilise.
In round 3 of the 2022 NRL season, Manly played their first match back at the redeveloped Brookvale Oval defeating Canterbury-Bankstown 13-12.

Players

2023 squad

2023 signings and transfers

Gains
Ben Condon - North Queensland Cowboys
Troy Dargan - Blacktown Workers Sea Eagles
Austin Dias - Wests Tigers
Jackson Ferris - Newtown Jets
Cooper Johns - Melbourne Storm
Dean Matterson - Mounties
Nathaniel Roache - Free Agent 
Josh Stuckey - Canterbury-Bankstown Bulldogs
Jake Toby - Blacktown Workers Sea Eagles
Kelma Tuilagi - Wests Tigers

Losses
Andrew Davey - Canterbury-Bankstown Bulldogs 
Kurt De Luis - Sydney Roosters
Kieran Foran - Gold Coast Titans
James Roumanous - Wests Tigers
Pio Seci - Released
James Segeyaro - FC Lézignan XIII
Alfred Smalley - Released
Martin Taupau - Brisbane Broncos
Dylan Walker - New Zealand Warriors 

Sources: Manly Sea Eagles

Past players

The first Manly-Warringah team to play in the NSWRFL Premiership on 12 April 1947 was:

 (c)

In 1990, the Manly-Warringah Sea Eagles club recognised their players, past and present, with a team announced to reflect the best squad up to that point. That team is listed below.

In 2006, a Dream Team of former Manly-Warringah Sea Eagles players was selected by a panel of selectors which featured former Manly-Warringah administrator Ken Arthurson, respected rugby league writer Ian Heads, the club chairman Kerry Sibraa and journalist Phil Rothfield.

Rivalries

North Sydney Bears
Prior to the ill-fated Northern Eagles joint venture from 2000 to 2002, the rivalry between the Manly-Warringah Sea Eagles and foundation club the North Sydney Bears was arguably one of rugby league's fiercest. Manly were admitted into the premiership in 1947 with North Sydney at the time being one of the main advocators for a team to be in Manly. In Manly's first season, most of the side was made up of former Norths players including captain Max Whitehead who played for North Sydney in their 1943 Grand Final defeat by Newtown.

The intense feelings between the two sides continued over the next couple of decades fuelled as players switched between the two clubs. The biggest defection occurred in 1971 when North's life member and one of the game's greatest wingers Ken Irvine joined Manly. Former Manly and North Sydney player Phil Blake said of the rivalry "It was certainly a game you looked forward playing in. The ground was always packed and it was always a great afternoon".

In 2016, North Sydney and Manly played their final competitive senior game against each other in the Canterbury Cup competition where the Bears won the match 32–18. The Sea Eagles announced that they would be merging their lower grade sides with the Blacktown Workers teams to become the Blacktown Workers Sea Eagles. The only competitive games played between the two clubs as of 2017 are between the Bears and Sea Eagles Harold Matthews Cup, SG Ball Cup and Jersey Flegg Cup competitions.

Parramatta Eels
Manly-Warringah and Parramatta built a fierce rivalry which started in the 1970s. They met in the 1976 NSWRFL Grand Final in which Manly denied the Parramatta club a maiden premiership. However, Parramatta won both the 1982 and 1983 Grand Finals against Manly. Since the 1983 grand final, Manly and Parramatta have only played against each other in one other finals game which was in 2005 when Parramatta finished as Minor Premiers and Manly finished in 8th place. Parramatta won the match 46–22.

On 18 May 2003, Parramatta and Manly played in the first ever golden point match in NRL history.  Manly would win the match 36–34 at Brookvale Oval courtesy of a Ben Walker penalty goal.In round 2 of the 2018 NRL season, Parramatta suffered their worst ever loss to Manly.  The game was played in temperatures of nearly 40 degrees where Manly ran out 54-0 winners.

In the 2019 NRL season, Parramatta beat Manly in round 25 to take Manly's fith spot on the ladder and  would go on to beat Brisbane 58–0 in the elimination final.  The victory is currently the biggest win in finals history.
In round 11 of the 2022 NRL season, Manly lead Parramatta by ten points in the second half before Parramatta scored two tries to make it 20-20. Parramatta player Mitchell Moses then converted a goal from the side line to win the match 22–20.
In round 21 of the 2022 NRL season, the two sides met at Brookvale Oval where Manly needed to defeat Parramatta if they were to stand any chance of reaching the finals.  Parramatta would win the game 36–20 with the maligned Jakob Arthur providing two try assists for Parramatta which ended Manly's finals hopes.

Cronulla-Sutherland Sharks
This rivalry has been dubbed the "Battle of the beaches", and they met in a brutal Grand Final in 1973 which was described as the dirtiest and 
toughest Grand Final of them all. Manly also defeated Cronulla 16–0 in the 1978 Grand Final Rematch after the original contest had an 11–11 draw. In 1996, Manly and Cronulla played each other in the 1996 preliminary final where Manly defeated Cronulla 24–0. In the 2013 finals series, the two clubs met at the Sydney Football Stadium with Manly running out 24-18 winners.

In week one of the 2019 finals series, Manly defeated Cronulla to win the game 28–16 at Brookvale Oval and eliminated Cronulla from the finals race.

Melbourne Storm

This was regarded as one of the biggest rivalries in the modern era, and the two clubs met in the 2007 and 2008 Grand Finals.

The 2008 Grand Final saw the Sea Eagles defeat Melbourne Storm 40-0 at ANZ Stadium in front of a crowd of 80,388. In the game Manly ran in eight tries to record the highest rugby league Grand Final margin in Australian history. It was Manly's seventh premiership title.

After Manly had gone out to win the 2011 premiership, both teams fought out the 2012 preliminary final in Melbourne. Melbourne defeated Manly 40–12, ending their chances of winning back to back titles. Melbourne would then go on to win their second legitimate premiership after being stripped of their 2007 and 2009 premierships after the NRL discovered systematic salary cap rorting by the club.

After nine years without playing each other in the finals, Manly and Melbourne met in week one of the 2021 NRL finals series where Melbourne won the match 40-12 at the Sunshine Coast Stadium.

Western Suburbs
Manly-Warringah had a fierce rivalry with foundation club Western Suburbs which started in the 1970s and continued through to the early 1980s.  The rivalry was dubbed as the "Fibros vs Silvertails".  Former Wests coach and now respected league writer Roy Masters was the brain behind the now famous catch-cry.  The rivalry was also fierce due to the two club's competing for the premiership with Western Suburbs winning the Minor Premiership in 1978 but it was Manly who claimed the 1978 premiership defeating Wests in the semi-finals.

Coaches

Records and statistics

Biggest win: 66–0 vs Canterbury (2021 NRL season)
Biggest loss: 6–68 vs Cronulla (2005 NRL season)
Most consecutive wins: 15 (1995 ARL season)
Most consecutive losses: 8 (1950 & 1998–99)
Wooden Spoons: 0
Biggest Grand Final win: 40-0 vs Melbourne Storm (2008)

Honours

New South Wales Rugby League, Australian Rugby League and National Rugby League: 8
 1972, 1973, 1976, 1978, 1987, 1996, 2008, 2011
New South Wales Rugby League, Australian Rugby League and National Rugby League runners-up: 11
 1951, 1957, 1959, 1968, 1970, 1982, 1983, 1995, 1997, 2007, 2013
 New South Wales Rugby League, Australian Rugby League and National Rugby League minor premierships: 9
 1971, 1972, 1973, 1976, 1983, 1987, 1995, 1996, 1997
 New South Wales Rugby League Club Championships: 4
 1972, 1983, 1987, 1988
World Club Challenge: 1
 2009
KB Cup: 2
 1982, 1983

Pre-season and youth honours 
World Sevens: 3
 1990, 1994, 1995
 Pre-Season Cup titles: 1
 1980
 First Division, Premier League: 5
 1954, 1960, 1969, 1973, 1988
 Jersey Flegg Cup: 4
 1961, 1974, 1987, 1988
 Presidents Cup: 2
 1946, 1970
 Third Grade: 1
 1952
 Holden Cup (Under 20s): 1
 2017
 Pre Season Challenge: 1
 2023

Supporters
The Sea Eagles, nicknamed the Silvertails, are well known as a team that most working-class rugby league fans traditionally love to hate.

In January 2021, the club announced that Cameron Faico would be the club's Number 1 ticket holder for the 2021 season.

Notable supporters of the club include:

Tony Abbott, 28th Prime Minister of Australia
Jim Anderson, Australian politician
Allen Aylett, Australian rules football player and administrator
Mike Baird, 44th Premier of New South Wales
Layne Beachley, World Surfing Champion
Gladys Berejiklian, 45th Premier of New South Wales
Billy Birmingham, comedian
Sean Fagan, Muay Thai fighter
Melinda Gainsford-Taylor, World Champion and Olympic athlete.
Grant Goldman, radio personality
Mike Goldman, radio and television personality
Wendy Harmer, author, children's writer, playwright and dramatist, radio show host, comedian and television personality
Brooke Hanson, Olympic and World Champion swimmer
Jean Hay, Australian politician
Hugh Jackman, actor
Jim Jefferies, comedian
Thomas Keneally, author
Barton Lynch, surfer
Doug Mulray, comedian and radio and television personality
Sarah Murdoch, model
Peter Phelps, actor
Mark Skaife, racing driver, multiple Bathurst 1000 winner
Michael Slater, cricketer
Tracey Spicer, television personality
Miles Stewart, triathlete
Gary Sweet, actor
Keith Urban, musician and singer

Manly Seabirds
The Manly Seabirds is the oldest cheerleading squad in the NRL. The Seabirds head scout is Carlos ‘The Jackal’ Faico.

References

Sources
 Rugby League History; Sean Fagan
 Encyclopedia of Rugby League Players, 1999; Alan Whiticker and Glen Hudson
 ABC of Rugby League, 1995; Malcolm Andrews
 Heritage Report on Brookvale Oval, Mayne-Wilson & Associates; August 2005

External links

 

 
National Rugby League clubs
Manly, New South Wales
1947 establishments in Australia